David Burke (born 6 November 1959) is a former Australian rules footballer who played with Essendon in the Victorian Football League (VFL).		
			
Burke played only three senior games for Essendon, but notably kicked five goals on his league debut, against North Melbourne at Arden Street Oval. He played in the Geelong Football League after leaving Essendon, first at St Mary's in 1982, then Bell Park from 1983 to 1986, as a playing assistant coach.

Notes

External links 
		
David Burke's profile at Essendonfc.com

1959 births
Living people
Australian rules footballers from Victoria (Australia)
Essendon Football Club players
St Mary's Sporting Club Inc players